William Bunting (1874–1947) was a rugby union international who represented England from 1897 to 1901. He also captained his country.

Early life
William Bunting was born on 9 August 1874 in Daventry.

Rugby union career
Bunting made his international debut on 6 February 1897 at Lansdowne Road in the Ireland vs England match.
Of the 9 matches he played for his national side he was on the winning side on 2 occasions.
He played his final match for England on 9 March 1901 at Rectory Field, Blackheath in the England vs Scotland match.

References

1874 births
1947 deaths
English rugby union players
England international rugby union players
Rugby union centres
Rugby union players from Daventry
Kent County RFU players